The Siemens Combino is a low-floor tram produced by Siemens Mobility (formerly Duewag). The first prototype was produced in 1996 at the Duewag works in Düsseldorf; the trams are now made in Krefeld-Uerdingen.

Due to its modular design using standardised components, and the resulting reduced costs, the Combino was for a time one of the most successful tram types. They were sold to 12 jurisdictions and a further development was sold to two others.

In 2007, a new generation of Combinos was sold to Bern and was known as the Siemens Combino XL. This was an updated version of the original design and was intended to correct defects in the original design.

Subsequently, the model was again renamed and is now known as the Avenio M. 14 of these were produced in 2011 with 12 going to Erfurt and two to Nordhausen.

The Siemens line has been complemented by a new design of trams called the Avenio, which have been built on the design technology of Siemens Combino Plus in Sul de Tejo and Budapest. Unlike the Combino, it does not have suspended sections but rather two axles under each body section. In essence, it is like a train of two axle cars. , the Avenio is on order for The Hague and Munich.

Use of the Siemens Combino world-wide
Around 500 trams went into service in the following cities:

Twenty-two trams were ordered by Verona, Italy, but the contract was cancelled because of the technical problems noted in this article.

Technical specifications

The tram is largely made out of aluminium, with a welded underframe to which the body framework is bolted in sections, which means that the Combino can easily be adopted to different lengths, widths and gauges. All versions are designed to have a  floor height and a  axle load. It can be built as a one-way or a two-way vehicle, and it is also produced as Siemens DuoCombino with an additional diesel propulsion system, courtesy of BMW's M67 3.9-litre twin-turbocharged V8 engine. The only city to receive the DuoCombino was Nordhausen, Germany.

They usually take 600 V DC overhead power and convert this to 400 V 3-phase AC power for the regenerative low wear motors via 3 IGBT PWM inverters. On board controls, lighting and air conditioning run at 24 V DC.

2004 recall due to flaws in construction
On March 12, 2004, Siemens admitted to problems concerning the stability of the car bodies and, as a precautionary measure, instructed all public transportation services to take all Combinos with a service distance of more than  out of service. Torsion forces generated in S-curves were much higher than anticipated, leading to cracks around the articulations between the car modules. Subsequently, hairline cracks were found in the joints of the aluminium bodies, which could cause the roof to collapse in the case of an accident.

The problem was acute in Combino cars that had run more . Cracks were reported on the connections between the sidewalls and the roof girders such that the safety of passengers in the wheel-less modules could not be assured in the event of a severe collision. These flaws were reported in many cities that had adopted the Siemens-Combinos, such as Düsseldorf, Freiburg, Augsburg, Erfurt, Hiroshima, Nordhausen, Basel, Potsdam, Bern, Amsterdam and Melbourne.

Siemens launched a three-stage process of rebuilding the 454 modules affected. Under this process the Combino modules were reinforced to give an expected 30-year life.

Potsdam
In 1997, the public transportation authorities of the city of Potsdam were the first to purchase Combino cars. The advantages of its low-floor technology were stressed during the introduction. A total of 48 cars were to be bought through 2009.

The order from Potsdam was of great importance for advertising the Combino in other cities. Cars from Potsdam were frequently used for demonstrations.

After a short period of service, many inhabitants of Potsdam noticed noises during the operation of the cars louder than those of the previously used Tatra cars. In March 2004, the 16 Potsdam cars were taken out of service. As a replacement, several Tatra cars which had been given to museums were taken back into service. The shortage was aggravated by the fact that several old cars had been sold to Hungary just a month before.

In June 2004, Potsdam and Siemens "amicably" declared that the at the time 32 outstanding cars were not going to be delivered. This decision is likely to have consequences for other cities.

Amsterdam

Earlier, Siemens technicians had identified stress fractures in the door segments of two of Amsterdam's oldest cars. But, according to Siemens, those turned out not to be dangerous, which is why the cars continued to be used. At the end of April 2004, it was decided not to call upon the twelve undelivered cars which were outstanding at that time.

Kaohsiung Demonstrator
A D-class Melbourne tram was borrowed by Siemens for a demonstrator in Kaohsiung for a three-month period in 2003-2004.

The city did not follow through with purchasing the cars or building a line after the trial. In 2013 the city began construction of the Circular LRT line, which utilises CAF Urbos vehicles.

Poznań

Poznań announced in 2002 a tender for low-floor trams. Siemens won the contract with Combino. Poznań ordered 14 trams, each consisting of five modules, three double doors and three bogies, identical to the Amsterdam version. The first Combino entered service at the end of 2003. Due to flaws in construction, not all trams were in active service. An agreement between Poznań and Siemens provided that the city would pay the fraction (31%) of trams' cost only after the refit of all 14 Combinos. Combinos were usually used on the Poznański Szybki Tramwaj (Poznań Fast Tram) (light rail), that is on lines 14, 15 and 16 until they got replaced by Solaris Tramino trams. Starting from then Combinos are used on different lines to provide access to low-floor trams in other parts of Poznań.

Siemens Combino Supra

The current Combino model (Combino MkI) will no longer be produced. For the cities which have already ordered Combinos, such as Budapest (Hungary) and Almada (Portugal), Siemens will provide trams based on an older ADtranz design , under the new name Combino Supra. The new Combinos will have thin stainless steel rather than aluminium carbodies. Siemens now also wants to sell the Viennese Ultra Low Floor (ULF), another 100%-low-floor model, to other cities. The first two Combino Supras were delivered March 14, 2006 to Budapest.

After serious initial teething problems, which involved door mechanism malfunctions that led to a recall of all Budapest Combino trams by Siemens, the trams were in regular service during 2006. After they had been repaired, Budapest's government decided that they would return them to Siemens. However, this did not happen because of contractual terms. The local public transport company began using them in 2007 and now they are working successfully again.

Gallery

References

External links

 Siemens Combino for Hiroshima Dentetsu (Brochure)
 Interactive 360° tour through a Combino Plus tram

Duewag tram vehicles
Tram vehicles of Germany
Tram vehicles of Hungary
Melbourne tram vehicles
Tram vehicles of Japan
Tram vehicles of the Netherlands
Tram vehicles of Poland
Tram vehicles of Switzerland
Siemens tram vehicles
Articulated passenger trains
600 V DC railway electrification